La Vanguardia Airport  is an airport serving the city of Villavicencio in the Meta Department of Colombia. It serves regular passenger, charter and cargo airlines as well as private sectors. The airport is just north of the city.

Airlines and destinations

Accidents and incidents
On 6 June 1985, Douglas C-53D HK-1340 of LACOL Colombia crashed shortly after take-off after the starboard engine failed while the aircraft was on a cargo flight. The aircraft was probably overloaded and it caught fire after crashing into trees. Three of the six people on board were killed.
On 28 May 1993, Douglas C-53D HK-2213 of Transoriente Colombia crashed near Villavicencio after both engines failed shortly after take-off from La Vanguardia Airport on a scheduled passenger flight. Seven of the 29 people on board were killed.
On 30 March 1996, Douglas C-47B HK-2497 of LANC Colombia was damaged beyond repair in a wheels-up landing on approach to La Vanguardia. The aircraft was on a domestic scheduled passenger flight to La Macarena Airport when an engine problem was encountered and the decision was made to return to La Vanguardia.
On July 9, 2000, a Curtiss C-46 HK-851-P of ADES Airlines, crashed near the airport after take off, when the engine number 2 failed due to fire. 13 of 19 people on board were killed including the Captain and First Officer. There were 7 survivors.
On 3 November 2010, an explosion took place at the airport warehouse. No casualties were reported. The explosion was caused by a parcel. As a result, several airlines suspended flights from the airport.
On 9 March 2019, Douglas DC-3 HK-2494 of LASER Aéro Colombia crashed en route from Jorge Enrique González Torres Airport, in San José del Guaviare, killing all 14 occupants.
On July 10, 2021, a DC-3 of Alianza, registered as HK2830, crashed into a mountain minutes after take-off. All three occupants were killed.

See also
Transport in Colombia
List of airports in Colombia

References

External links
Vanguardia Airport at OpenStreetMap
Vanguardia Airport at OurAirports

Vanguardia Airport at FallingRain

Airports in Colombia
Buildings and structures in Meta Department